North Hartland is a census-designated place (CDP) in the town of Hartland, Windsor County, Vermont, United States.  As of the 2010 census, the population of the CDP was 302.

Geography
North Hartland is located in eastern Windsor County at the junction of the Ottauquechee River with the Connecticut River. U.S. Route 5 passes through the village, connecting White River Junction to the north with Hartland and Windsor to the south. Interstate 91 passes just north of the village, but there is no direct access from North Hartland.

References

Census-designated places in Vermont
Census-designated places in Windsor County, Vermont